Anna Karenina is a 1992 musical with a book and lyrics by Peter Kellogg and music by Daniel Levine.  Based on the classic 1877 Leo Tolstoy novel of the same name, it focuses on the tragic title character, a fashionable but unhappily married woman, and her ill-fated liaison with Count Vronsky, which ultimately leads to her downfall. Directed by Theodore Mann, the Broadway production opened on August 26, 1992, at the Circle in the Square Theatre and ran for 46 performances. The cast included Ann Crumb in the title role and John Cunningham as Nicolai Karenin.

Synopsis
In 1870s Russia, Anna Karenina is a virtuous woman married to a government official 15 years older than she.  Anna falls in love with the handsome and charming Count Alexei Vronsky, but she is torn by her loyalty to her husband and small son.

Meanwhile, Vronsky had first courted Ekaterina "Kitty" Alexandrovna Shcherbatsky, who chose him over gentleman farmer Konstantin Dmitrievich Levin.  When Vronsky falls in love with Anna instead, Kitty becomes ill, and Levin, heartsick, withdraws to his country estate.  Kitty and Levin finally declare their love for each other.

Anna's choice of love over duty leads to tragedy:  Her affair with Vronsky is revealed, and she is shunned; eventually, she throws herself in front of an oncoming train.

Broadway production
After 18 previews, the Broadway production, directed by Theodore Mann and choreographed by Patricia Birch, and associate choreographer, Jonathan Stuart Cerullo, opened on August 26, 1992, at the Circle in the Square Theatre. In keeping with the theater's small size (by Broadway standards), the staging included a sparse set, an almost bare stage, and only seven members in the orchestra, with orchestrations by Peter Matz. In addition to Crumb and Cunningham, the cast included Scott Wentworth as Vronsky, Gregg Edelman as Constantin Levin, Melissa Errico as Princess Kitty Scherbatssky, and Jerry Lanning as Prince Oblonsky.

Anna Karenina was received poorly by the critics. Time deemed it "earnest, intermittently moving but never quite thrilling", and The New York Times was harsher, calling the show a "series of misperceptions and errors in judgment." Other critics believed the musical's approach to be trivial, including Variety, which called the musical "comic-strip Tolstoy".

The musical ran for 46 performances. It received Tony Award nominations for Best Actress in a Musical (Ann Crumb), Best Book of a Musical, Best Score of a Musical, and Best Featured Actor in a Musical (Gregg Edelman), as well as a Drama Desk Award nomination for Lanning.

A recording of the musical released on August 7, 2007, stars Melissa Errico as Anna, Gregg Edelman as Levin, Brian d'Arcy James as Vronsky, Jeff McCarthy as Karenin, Marc Kudisch as Oblonsky and Kerry Butler as Kitty.

In 2006, a version of the Dan Levine, Peter Kellogg musical was produced and performed in Japan. The original Japan cast included Maki Ichiro, Yoshio Inoue, Hitomi Harukaze. A two-DVD set with a length of more than three hours of the Japanese language production is available. There is also a CD of the songs sung in Japanese.

Musical numbers

Act I   
Prologue: St. Petersburg Train Station
On a Train – Anna, Vronsky, Levin, Chorus  
Scene 1: Moscow train station, next morning 
There's More to Life Than Love – Stiva and Anna
Scene 2: – Kitty Scherbatsky's house, later the same day
How Awful – Kitty
Would You? – Levin
In a Room – Levin, Kitty, Anna, Vronsky
Scene 3: A ball, a few days later
Waltza and Mazurka – Anna, Kitty, Vronsky, Stiva, Chorus
Scene 4: A small station between Moscow and St. Petersburg, the next night
Scene 5: Anna's house in St. Petersburg
Nothing Has Changed – Anna
Scene 6: Prince Tversky's home, that night
Lowlands – Basso
Scene 7: Croquet Lawn, several weeks later
Rumors – Chorus
Scene 8: Kitty's house
How Many Men? – Kitty
Scene 9: A small dance in St. Petersburg
We Were Dancing – Vronsky
Scene 10: On the way home
I'm Lost – Anna
Scene 11: Anna's house
Karenin's List – Karenin
Scene 12: Vronsky's apartment
Waiting for You – Anna and Vronsky

Act II      
Scene 1: Anna's house, three months later
This Can't Go On – Anna, Vronsky, Karenin
Scene 2: Levin's estate and Italy
Peasant's Idyll – Chorus
That Will Serve Her Right – Levin
Scene 3: A villa in Rome
Everything's Fine – Anna and Vronsky
Scene 4: Kitty's house
Would You (Reprise) – Levin and Kitty
Scene 5: A hotel in Moscow
Everything's Fine (Reprise) – Anna
Scene 6: Karenin's house
Only at Night – Karenin
Scene 7: St. Petersburg Train Station
Finale – Anna and Chorus

References

External links
Internet Broadway Database listing
New York Times review

1992 musicals
Broadway musicals
Musicals based on novels